The 1966 Tasmanian Australian National Football League (TANFL) premiership season was an Australian Rules football competition staged in Hobart, Tasmania over eighteen (18) roster rounds and four (4) finals series matches between 2 April and 17 September 1966.

Participating Clubs
Clarence District Football Club
Glenorchy District Football Club
Hobart Football Club
New Norfolk District Football Club
North Hobart Football Club
Sandy Bay Football Club

1966 TANFL Club Coaches
Stuart Spencer (Clarence)
Bobby Parsons (Glenorchy)
John Watts (Hobart)
Trevor Leo (New Norfolk)
Dick Grimmond (North Hobart)
Rex Geard (Sandy Bay)

TANFL Reserves Grand Final
Clarence 12.13 (85) v Glenorchy 7.8 (50) – North Hobart Oval

TANFL Under-19's Grand Final
(Saturday, 24 September 1966)
New Norfolk 12.8 (80) v Nth Hobart 5.9 (39) – North Hobart Oval

State Preliminary Final
(Saturday, 24 September 1966)
Hobart: 3.5 (23) | 6.6 (42) | 9.13 (67) | 11.19 (85)
Burnie Tigers: 2.5 (17) | 7.8 (50) | 9.9 (63) | 10.11 (71)
Attendance: 4,040 at West Park Oval

State Grand Final
(Saturday, 1 October 1966)
City-South: 1.5 (11) | 5.9 (39) | 8.10 (58) | 10.15 (75)
Hobart: 2.3 (15) | 6.5 (41) | 8.10 (58) | 9.13 (67)
Attendance: 8,652 at York Park

Intrastate Matches
Jubilee Shield (Saturday, 23 April 1966)
 NTFA 20.19 (139) v TANFL 13.10 (88) – Att: 6,877 at York Park

Jubilee Shield (Saturday, 21 May 1966)
TANFL 25.13 (163) v NWFU 12.8 (80) – Att: 12,037 at North Hobart Oval

Inter-Association Match (Saturday, 21 May 1966)
TANFL 17.17 (119) v Huon FA 16.20 (116) – Att: 12,037 at North Hobart Oval (Intrastate Curtain-Raiser)

Interstate Matches
See: 1966 Australian National Football Carnival

Match Two (Thursday, 9 June 1966) 
Victorian FL: 5.6 (36) | 12.13 (85) | 21.21 (147) | 26.24 (180)
Tasmania: 4.1 (25) | 7.2 (44) | 10.4 (64) | 11.13 (79)
Attendance: 20,047 at North Hobart Oval (Double header)

Match Four (Saturday, 11 June 1966) 
Tasmania: 4.6 (30) | 6.13 (49) | 13.22 (100) | 19.27 (141)
Victorian FA: 3.1 (19) | 4.3 (27) | 5.5 (35) | 7.11 (53)
Attendance: 23,764 at North Hobart Oval (Double header) *

Match Seven (Thursday, 16 June 1966) 
Western Australia: 3.6 (24) | 8.8 (56) | 15.12 (102) | 17.13 (115)
Tasmania: 5.2 (32) | 11.4 (70) | 13.8 (86) | 16.10 (106)
Attendance: 10,199 at North Hobart Oval (Double header)

Match Nine (Saturday, 18 June 1966) (TV highlights: Tasmania v Sth Australia)
South Australia: 3.0 (18) | 7.3 (45) | 11.5 (71) | 14.7 (91)
Tasmania: 1.3 (9) | 2.7 (19) | 4.9 (33) | 9.13 (67)
Attendance: 23,368 at North Hobart Oval (Double header)

Leading Goalkickers: TANFL
 Peter Hudson (New Norfolk) – 103
 John Mills (Clarence) – 81
 Brent Palfreyman (Sandy Bay) – 48
 Jeremy Thiessen (Hobart) – 40
 Darrell West (Glenorchy) – 40

Medal Winners
Burnie Payne (Hobart) – William Leitch Medal
W.Patmore (Nth Hobart) – George Watt Medal (Reserves)
Tony Browning (New Norfolk) – V.A Geard Medal (Under-19's)
Barry Browning (New Norfolk) – Weller Arnold Medal (Best player in Intrastate matches)

1966 TANFL Ladder

Round 1
(Saturday, 2 April 1966)
Clarence 10.14 (74) v New Norfolk 6.16 (52) – Att: 5,282 at North Hobart Oval
Hobart 14.18 (102) v Nth Hobart 13.17 (95) – Att: 4,132 at TCA Ground
Sandy Bay 10.7 (67) v Glenorchy 6.13 (49) – Att: 4,266 at KGV Park

Round 2
(Saturday, 9 April & Monday, 11 April 1966)
Hobart 14.14 (98) v Clarence 11.5 (71) – Att: 6,147 at North Hobart Oval
New Norfolk 12.13 (85) v Sandy Bay 12.12 (84) – Att: 3,187 at Queenborough Oval
Glenorchy 16.16 (112) v Nth Hobart 13.7 (85) – Att: 7,704 at North Hobart Oval (Monday)

Round 3
(Saturday, 16 April 1966)
Hobart 12.14 (86) v Glenorchy 12.13 (85) – Att: 6,263 at North Hobart Oval
New Norfolk 19.7 (121) v Nth Hobart 9.9 (63) – Att: 2,928 at Boyer Oval
Sandy Bay 11.9 (75) v Clarence 6.14 (50) – Att: 3,618 at Queenborough Oval

Round 4
(Saturday, 23 April & Monday 25 April 1966)
Sandy Bay 12.12 (84) v Nth Hobart 10.14 (74) – Att: 4,961 at North Hobart Oval
New Norfolk 17.14 (116) v Hobart 12.17 (89) – Att: 2,915 at TCA Ground
Clarence 16.9 (105) v Glenorchy 11.19 (85) – Att: 6,520 at KGV Park (Anzac Day) *

Round 5
(Saturday, 30 April 1966)
Hobart 19.22 (136) v Sandy Bay 15.14 (104) – Att: 5,594 at North Hobart Oval
Glenorchy 12.7 (79) v New Norfolk 8.7 (55) – Att: 3,100 at Boyer Oval
Clarence 13.14 (92) v Nth Hobart 8.23 (71) – Att: 2,978 at Bellerive Oval

Round 6
(Saturday, 7 May 1966)
Hobart 10.17 (77) v Nth Hobart 9.10 (64) – Att: 4,322 at North Hobart Oval
Glenorchy 11.13 (79) v Sandy Bay 10.12 (72) – Att: 4,134 at Queenborough Oval
New Norfolk 19.11 (125) v Clarence 6.12 (48) – Att: 3,302 at Boyer Oval

Round 7
(Saturday, 14 May 1966)
New Norfolk 17.12 (114) v Sandy Bay 7.17 (59) – Att: 6,052 at North Hobart Oval
Clarence 17.17 (119) v Hobart 9.12 (66) – Att: 2,979 at Bellerive Oval
Glenorchy 13.16 (94) v Nth Hobart 3.8 (26) – Att: 3,293 at KGV Park

Round 8
(Saturday, 28 May 1966)
New Norfolk 15.14 (104) v Nth Hobart 9.14 (68) – Att: 4,132 at North Hobart Oval
Glenorchy 17.10 (112) v Hobart 13.15 (93) – Att: 4,161 at TCA Ground
Sandy Bay 9.10 (64) v Clarence 8.14 (62) – Att: 3,635 at Bellerive Oval

Round 9
(Saturday, 4 June 1966)
Glenorchy 13.17 (95) v Clarence 9.11 (65) – Att: 5,989 at North Hobart Oval
Sandy Bay 17.15 (117) v Nth Hobart 14.14 (98) – Att: 2,880 at Queenborough Oval
New Norfolk 16.8 (104) v Hobart 5.16 (46) – Att: 3,279 at Boyer Oval

Round 10
(Saturday, 9 June & Monday, 11 June 1966)
Clarence 14.9 (93) v Nth Hobart 11.15 (81) – Att: 2,649 at North Hobart Oval
Hobart 15.17 (107) v Sandy Bay 14.13 (97) – Att: 2,204 at TCA Ground
New Norfolk 11.15 (81) v Glenorchy 10.14 (74) – Att: 4,125 at KGV Park (Monday)

Round 11
(Saturday, 2 July 1966)
Glenorchy 12.9 (81) v Sandy Bay 9.20 (74) – Att: 4,351 at North Hobart Oval
New Norfolk 12.9 (81) v Clarence 11.12 (78) – Att: 3,247 at Bellerive Oval
Hobart 15.17 (107) v Nth Hobart 9.18 (72) – Att: 1,896 at TCA Ground

Round 12
(Saturday, 9 July 1966)
Nth Hobart 14.7 (91) v Glenorchy 10.12 (72) – Att: 3,445 at North Hobart Oval
Hobart 13.19 (97) v Clarence 9.7 (61) – Att: 2,998 at TCA Ground
New Norfolk 15.13 (103) v Sandy Bay 12.17 (89) – Att: 3,282 at Queenborough Oval

Round 13
(Saturday, 16 July 1966)
Clarence 12.13 (85) v Sandy Bay 10.10 (70) – Att: 2,996 at North Hobart Oval
New Norfolk 20.14 (134) v Nth Hobart 6.14 (50) – Att: 2,561 at Boyer Oval
Glenorchy 13.14 (92) v Hobart 12.14 (86) – Att: 2,852 at KGV Park

Round 14
(Saturday, 23 July 1966)
Nth Hobart 5.11 (41) v Sandy Bay 4.10 (34) – Att: 2,140 at North Hobart Oval
Hobart 12.4 (76) v New Norfolk 6.9 (45) – Att: 2,860 at TCA Ground
Clarence 7.8 (50) v Glenorchy 5.12 (42) – Att: 2,489 at Bellerive Oval

Round 15
(Saturday, 30 July 1966)
New Norfolk 8.3 (51) v Glenorchy 4.8 (32) – Att: 5,431 at North Hobart Oval
Sandy Bay 7.19 (61) v Hobart 9.5 (59) – Att: 2,512 at Queenborough Oval
Clarence 15.14 (104) v Nth Hobart 9.7 (61) – Att: 2,456 at Bellerive Oval

Round 16
(Saturday, 6 August 1966)
Hobart 14.15 (99) v Nth Hobart 10.6 (66) – Att: 2,924 at North Hobart Oval
Glenorchy 15.12 (102) v Sandy Bay 8.4 (52) – Att: 3,242 at Queenborough Oval
New Norfolk 10.8 (68) v Clarence 6.7 (43) – Att: 3,145 at Boyer Oval

Round 17
(Saturday, 13 August 1966)
Clarence 12.14 (86) v Hobart 12.6 (78) – Att: 5,001 at North Hobart Oval
Glenorchy 15.14 (104) v Nth Hobart 6.12 (48) – Att: 2,702 at KGV Park
New Norfolk 12.16 (88) v Sandy Bay 7.6 (48) – Att: 2,302 at Boyer Oval

Round 18
(Saturday, 20 August 1966)
New Norfolk 16.12 (108) v Nth Hobart 13.12 (90) – Att: 2,700 at North Hobart Oval
Hobart 10.16 (76) v Glenorchy 8.13 (61) – Att: 5,281 at KGV Park
Clarence 16.13 (109) v Sandy Bay 8.9 (57) – Att: 2,379 at Bellerive Oval

First Semi Final
(Saturday, 27 August 1966)
Glenorchy: 4.2 (26) | 9.6 (60) | 11.8 (74) | 13.10 (88)
Clarence: 3.2 (20) | 4.5 (29) | 8.9 (57) | 9.12 (66)
Attendance: 12,303 at North Hobart Oval

Second Semi Final
(Saturday, 3 September 1966)
Hobart: 2.5 (17) | 4.8 (32) | 7.11 (53) | 11.14 (80)
New Norfolk: 3.1 (19) | 6.4 (40) | 7.8 (50) | 10.9 (69)
Attendance: 12,432 at North Hobart Oval

Preliminary Final
(Saturday, 10 September 1966)
Glenorchy: 2.5 (17) | 4.8 (32) | 5.10 (40) | 10.11 (71)
New Norfolk: 4.3 (27) | 4.6 (30) | 7.8 (50) | 8.12 (60)
Attendance: 13,486 at North Hobart Oval

Grand Final
(Saturday, 17 September 1966)
Hobart: 4.3 (27) | 6.9 (45) | 8.10 (58) | 10.14 (74)
Glenorchy: 3.0 (18) | 5.1 (31) | 7.4 (46) | 11.7 (73)
Attendance: 16,699 at North Hobart Oval

Source: All scores and statistics courtesy of the Hobart Mercury and Saturday Evening Mercury (SEM) publications.

Tasmanian Football League seasons